Weißig is the name of the following places:

in Saxony:
 Weißig am Raschütz, municipality in the district of Meißen
 Weißig (Dresden), quarter of Dresden
 Weißig (Freital), municipal subdivision of Freital
 Weißig (Kubschütz) quarter of Kubschütz
 Weißig (Lohsa), quarter of Lohsa
 Weißig (Nünchritz), quarter of Nünchritz
 Weißig (Oßling), quarter of Oßling
 Weißig (Struppen), quarter of Struppen

in Thuringia:
 Weißig (Gera), quarter of Gera

in Poland:
 Wysoka, Zielona Góra County
 Wysokie, Lower Silesian Voivodeship